The women's 10,000 metres event at the 1992 World Junior Championships in Athletics was held in Seoul, Korea, at Olympic Stadium on 19 September.

Medalists

Results

Final
19 September

Participation
According to an unofficial count, 20 athletes from 13 countries participated in the event.

References

10,000 metres
Long distance running at the World Athletics U20 Championships